"Hot Line" is a song recorded by American family group the Sylvers, from their 1976 album Something Special. It was written by Freddie Perren and Kenneth St. Lewis.  It became an international Top 10 hit, and is a gold record.

The song tells the story of a lovelorn young man who anticipates getting in touch with his beloved over the phone.  He requests that the telephone operator connect the call, but not to listen in.  He also says that he's willing to get in touch with the FBI and the CIA in order to locate the girl he's interested in speaking to.

"Hot Line" was the Sylvers' second biggest hit, peaking in early 1977 at number 5 on the Billboard Hot 100 chart, number 4 on the Cash Box chart, and number 3 on the R&B charts.  Billboard ranked the song as the 25th biggest hit of 1977.

Chart performance

Weekly charts

Year-end charts

References

External links
 

1976 singles
The Sylvers songs
Songs written by Freddie Perren
Song recordings produced by Freddie Perren
1976 songs
Capitol Records singles
RPM Top Singles number-one singles